Pseudostomella is a genus of worms belonging to the family Thaumastodermatidae.

The genus has almost cosmopolitan distribution.

Species:

Pseudostomella andamanica 
Pseudostomella cataphracta 
Pseudostomella cheraensis 
Pseudostomella dolichopoda 
Pseudostomella etrusca 
Pseudostomella faroensis 
Pseudostomella indica 
Pseudostomella klauserae 
Pseudostomella koreana 
Pseudostomella longifurca 
Pseudostomella malayica 
Pseudostomella mandela 
Pseudostomella megapalpator 
Pseudostomella plumosa 
Pseudostomella roscovita 
Pseudostomella squamalongispinosa 
Pseudostomella triancra

References

Gastrotricha